Cheech & Chong's Wedding Album is the fourth studio album recorded by comedy duo Cheech & Chong, released in 1974 on Ode Records.  It was certified Gold by the RIAA.

Cover art 
The album cover of Cheech & Chong's Wedding Album had concept origination, design and art direction by Peter Corriston and contained unique artwork that made the album look like an actual wedding album; the album's design was even nominated for a Grammy award.

In the inner fold of the original vinyl LP, there are many pictures of the "wedding and reception".  Cheech and Chong, both playing the groom, were dressed to look like conjoined twins, while the bride, a blonde whose face remained hidden by wearing a plain brown bag over her head in every photo, is in the late stages of pregnancy.

Original sleeve inserts contained mail order information for various Cheech & Chong paraphernalia, including candles, T-shirts, and ceramic hand-painted roach clips.

Track listing

Charts

See also
Cheech Marin
Tommy Chong

References

1974 albums
Wedding Album, The
Ode Records albums
Warner Records albums
1970s comedy albums